The Hudson City School District is a school district in Ohio, covering most of Hudson and Boston Heights, and parts of Boston Township and Cuyahoga Falls. The high-school is ranked #460 in the nation, by U.S. News & World Report, as of 2021.

Board of Education

Current members
David Zurro (President)
Steve DiMauro (Vice President)
James Field
Alisa Wright
Tom Tobin

Administration
 Steve Farnsworth (Interim Superintendent)
 Doreen Osmun (Assistant Superintendent)
 Phillip Butto (Treasurer)
 Tom Barone (Business Manager)
 Kelly Kempf (Pupil Services)
 Lisa Hunt (Human Resources)
 Jennifer Reece (Communications Manager)

Changes in Hudson City School District
 1919: Hudson Township Rural School District is formed, consisting of the former Hudson Village School District and the township school districts.
 1998: Hudson Local School District became Hudson City School District.
 2010: Hudson Elementary is demolished.
2018–2022: The Administration and Board of Education begin making changes to multiple schools and facilitates around the Hudson City School District.

Schools
Hudson High School, 2500 Hudson-Aurora Road
Principal: Mike Miller
Hudson Middle School, 83 North Oviatt Street
Principal: Kimberly Cockley
East Woods Intermediate School, 120 North Hayden Parkway
Principal: Natalie Wininger
Ellsworth Hill Elementary, 7750 Stow Rd
Principal: Jen Filomeana
McDowell Early Learning School, 280 North Hayden Parkway 
Principal: Beth Trivelli

Previous locations
Hudson Elementary, 34 North Oviatt Street (torn down in 2010)
Last Principal: Mark Leventhal
Evamere Elementary, 76 North Hayden Parkway (closed in 2021)
Last Principal: Beth Trivelli

Other facilities
Al Statts Transportation Facility and Koberna Salt Storage Facility opened in June 2019. Is a bus garage and salt storage facility.
Lavelli Stadium, built in 1972, named in 1975, when 1941 Hudson High School graduate Dante Lavelli was inducted into the Pro Football Hall of Fame.
Memorial Stadium, has been built on Hudson High School (Ohio) property beside the W-wing faculty parking lot.
Ada Cooper Miller Natatorium, attached to East Woods Elementary.  Ada Cooper Miller served on the Hudson Board of Education for 40 years, and presided for 25 of those years.

Previous locations
 Petermann Limited, 91 Owen Brown Street (closed)

References

External links
Hudson City School District

School districts in Summit County, Ohio